Alessandro Andrei (born 3 January 1959) is an Italian former shot putter. He was born in Florence.

Biography
Andrei threw with his right hand, using the glide technique (at time many elite-level shot putters had switched to the spin/rotation style.) Andrei won the gold medal at the 1984 Summer Olympics held in Los Angeles, California. In 1987 he broke the world record three times in the same competition with successive throws of 22.72, 22.84 & 22.91 m (and finishing the sequence with a throw of 22.74 m). He was the first athlete in history to have a shot put series with all 6 throws over 22 meters, an accomplishment that wasn't repeated until 2020 by Ryan Crouser.

He is married to Agnese Maffeis.

World record
 Shot put: 22.91 m -  Viareggio, 12 August 1987 (currently the Italian record)

Shots series

Achievements

See also
 Shot put all-time top performer
 Men's shot put world record progression
 FIDAL Hall of Fame
 Italian all-time lists - Shot put
 Italy national athletics team - More caps
 List of Italian records in athletics
 List of Italian records in masters athletics

References

External links
 
 

1959 births
Living people
Italian male shot putters
Olympic gold medalists for Italy
Athletes (track and field) at the 1984 Summer Olympics
Athletes (track and field) at the 1988 Summer Olympics
Athletes (track and field) at the 1992 Summer Olympics
Olympic athletes of Italy
World record setters in athletics (track and field)
Athletics competitors of Fiamme Oro
World Athletics Championships medalists
Medalists at the 1984 Summer Olympics
Olympic gold medalists in athletics (track and field)
Mediterranean Games gold medalists for Italy
Athletes (track and field) at the 1991 Mediterranean Games
Athletes (track and field) at the 1997 Mediterranean Games
Universiade medalists in athletics (track and field)
World Athletics Championships athletes for Italy
Mediterranean Games medalists in athletics
Universiade silver medalists for Italy
Medalists at the 1985 Summer Universiade